St. Michael's Secondary School, Penampang (Malay: Sekolah Menengah St. Michael (SMSM), Penampang) commonly known as SM St. Michael is a national secondary school in Penampang, Sabah, Malaysia. It was named after Saint Michael the Archangel.

Mill Hill missionaries built the school to spread Catholicism among the local Kadazan-dusun community, who were mostly animists. The school started with a bamboo building and continued onwards to become a major challenge for traditional top schools. During the beginnings, Catholic priests lived and taught at the school. Following the formation of Malaysia on 16 September 1963, the education given by the school became more secular.

The school, built in 1890, is among the oldest in Sabah; it was officially established as a secondary school in 1958.

In December 2022, the morning session discipline teacher, En. Richel Chong, ended his 22-year service for SMSM since the year 2000.

History 
The school was built in 1890 by Mill Hill missionaries to convert the local people into Catholicism.  The mode of transportation was then the Moyog River.  This caused the present day St. Michael's church and the school to be built in Kampong Dabak, Penampang which was close to the river.  The first school building was made out of bamboo. It was also a home to the church's priests.  The bare ground was the floor and it was walled around 3 feet from the ground.  The students used a slate and a block of limestone to write.  The school was not a success, as most locals did not allow their children to go to school as they feared the British North Borneo Company would take their children as colonial soldiers of the British Armed Forces.  Students paid their fees in rice, tapioca, yam, fruit and firewood.

The land which the school stands now used to be a paddy field.  It was donated by the locals to the school.  Despite the fact that the students shared their classroom with village goats, the school had a good reputation as students as far as Tambunan and Kuala Penyu came to study in the school.  This caused the opening of a boarding school.

During World War II, the Japanese occupation forced the temporary closure of the school.  However, the school was not badly damaged, suffering only from machine gun bullets. Rev. Fr. M. Henselmans applied to convert the school to a senior or secondary school on 10 August 1957 to provide the 53 students who were then in primary six with a post-primary school. The school was converted into a secondary school on 10 March 1958 with Tambunan native Marcus Otigil at the helm. The school rose slowly, with the older buildings replaced by newer ones over the years.

Sisterhood with Yong-ho High School, South Korea 
SM St Michael fostered a relationship with Yong-ho High School, South Korea and ended their participation in the KDCA-ISEP exchange program. They dubbed the relation a sisterhood and organised an English Camp for South Korean students who arrived in Sabah in July 2008. SM St Michael's students are scheduled to go to South Korea in November or December.

Principals 
 Marcus Otigil (1958–1961)
 Fr. Roger McGorty (1961–1963)
 Fr. M. Hurley (1963–1965)
 Fr. John Rooney (1966–1967)
 Fr. W. Van Gastel (1967–1970)
 Stanislaus Tendahal (1970–1971)
 Shenton de Rozario (1971–1972)
 Datin Ritamma Joseph (1972–1973)
 Hin Tian Chin (1973–1974)
 K. V. Joshua (1974–1982)
 Katherine Philip (1982–1987)
 Gan Lee Ping (1987–1990)
 Chandran Vengadasamy (1990–1992)
 Range Maurice Majikol (1992–1994)
 Datin Lorna Mathews (1995–2003)
 Fidelis P. Insing (2003–2006)
 Marie Yong Pik Hua (2006–2015)
 Jennifer Asing (2015–present)

Notable alumni 
 Tan Sri Bernard Dompok – former Sabah Chief Minister and former minister in the Malaysian cabinet
 Stacy Angie Anam – Malaysian singer and dancer
 Velvet Lawrence Aduk – singer-songwriter and radio announcer
 Datuk Peter Mojuntin – former state cabinet minister who perished in the 1976 Double Six tragedy
 Datuk Ewon Benedick – cabinet minister since 2022 in the Pakatan Harapan-led unity government

References 

Schools in Sabah
Catholic schools in Malaysia